Parabatinga is a monotypic genus of South American wandering spiders containing the single species, Parabatinga brevipes. It was first described by D. Polotow & Antônio Brescovit in a 2009 revision of Isoctenus, naming Ctenus brevipes as the female holotype and Ctenus taeniatus as the male holotype. They are found in Colombia, Brazil, Bolivia, Paraguay, Argentina, and Uruguay. The name is derived from the Tupian "paraba", meaning "spot", and "tinga", meaning white, referring to the white spots found on the ventral part of the abdomen.

References

Ctenidae
Monotypic Araneomorphae genera
Spiders of South America
Taxa named by Antônio Brescovit